The New England Ski Museum is a non-profit operation in Franconia, New Hampshire.

History
Founded in 1977, in 1982 it moved into its permanent building near the tramway of Cannon Mountain ski area, in Franconia Notch State Park.

Operations
The museum was designed to preserve the history of commercial and recreational skiing, both alpine and cross-country, in the northeastern United States. It is one of four ski museums in the United States that are recognized by the United States Ski and Snowboard Association.

External links

Sports museums in New Hampshire
Museums in Grafton County, New Hampshire
Skiing in the United States
History museums in New Hampshire
Ski museums and halls of fame
Franconia, New Hampshire
Skiing in New Hampshire